Megillah ("scroll") is the tenth Tractate of Mishnah in the Order Moed. It and its Gemara deal with the laws of Purim and offers exegetical understandings to the Book of Esther. It also includes laws concerning the public reading of the Torah and other communal synagogue practices. There is also a segment in the first chapter which details certain miscellaneous laws. A megillah is a finely detailed account or book but the term by itself commonly refers to the Book of Esther.

Sources
 Schottenstein Edition of the Babylonian Talmud: Talmud Bavli: The Gemara, Schottenstein Edition - Tractate Megillah, 1991, Artscroll

External links
 Mishnah Megillah text in Hebrew
 Full Hebrew and English text of the Mishnah for tractate Megillah on Sefaria
Full Hebrew and English text of the Talmud Bavli for tractate Megillah on Sefaria
Full Hebrew text of the Talmud Yerushalmi for tractate Megillah on Sefaria
Full Hebrew and English text of the Tosefta for tractate Megillah on Sefaria

Book of Esther